The R533 is a Regional Route in South Africa.

Route
Its western terminus is the R36 at Verraiersnek Pass in Limpopo between Ohrigstad and Mashishing (Lydenburg). Heading east, it crosses into Mpumalanga through De Berg Pass into Pilgrim's Rest. On the other side, the R532 joins from the south. The routes continue to Graskop where the R532 leaves heading north. From Graskop, the R533 carries on east through the Kowyns Pass. On the far side of the pass, the R535 diverges, heading just south of east, whereas the R533 then turns to a north-easterly direction, ending at an intersection with the R40 in Bushbuckridge.

References

Regional Routes in Limpopo
Regional Routes in Mpumalanga